The 1742 English cricket season was the 46th cricket season since the earliest recorded eleven-aside match was played. Details have survived of ten significant matches, including two famous matches London and Slindon in September.

Recorded matches 
Records have survived of ten significant matches:

First mentions

Clubs and teams
 Bromley Cricket Club
 Kent & Surrey

References

Bibliography

Further reading
 
 
 
 
 
 

1742 in English cricket
English cricket seasons in the 18th century